Shalva Mamukashvili (Georgian: შალვა მამუკაშვილი) (born 2 October 1990 in Tbilisi, Georgia) is a Georgian rugby union player.

Mamukashvili first played for Armia during the Georgia Championship; he went on to feature in Georgia's 2012 European Nations Cup squad, making his debut against Spain. Mamukashvili also appeared in the sides 2012 end of year tour campaign.

On 15 August 2014, Shalva signed a contract to join Sale Sharks in the Aviva Premiership in England from the 2014–15 season. On 11 November 2015, Shalva signed a contract to join Glasgow Warriors until the end of the 2015–16 season.

In 2020, he returned to England to join Leicester Tigers ahead of the 2020-21 season. On 23 February 2021 Leicester announced that they had come to an agreement with Shalva to release him from his contract early.

References 

Rugby union players from Georgia (country)
Georgia international rugby union players
1990 births
Living people
Glasgow Warriors players
Montpellier Hérault Rugby players
RC Toulonnais players
Yenisey-STM Krasnoyarsk players
Rugby union hookers
Expatriate rugby union players in Scotland
Rugby union players from Tbilisi
Leicester Tigers players
Sale Sharks players
US Carcassonne players
The Black Lion players